Spesbona is a genus of damselfly in the family Platycnemididae.

References

Platycnemididae
Zygoptera genera